The spotted stargazer (Genyagnus monopterygius) is a stargazer of the family Uranoscopidae, found on the continental shelf around New Zealand and other southern Pacific islands, at depths down to .

References

 
 Tony Ayling & Geoffrey Cox, Collins Guide to the Sea Fishes of New Zealand,  (William Collins Publishers Ltd, Auckland, New Zealand 1982) 

Uranoscopidae
Fish described in 1801